Carnal Repercussions is the debut full-length album by American deathcore band Salt the Wound. The album was released on February 5, 2008 through Rotten Records.

Track listing

Reception
About.com  link

Personnel
Salt the Wound
Jake Scott – guitar
Vince Stropki – guitar
Brian Martinez – bass 
Kevin Schaefer - vocals
Brandon Tabor - drums
Production
Produced by Cole Martinez

Salt the Wound albums
2008 debut albums